Stomopteryx pelomicta is a moth of the family Gelechiidae. It was described by Edward Meyrick in 1928. It is found in Atlas Mountains.

References

Moths described in 1928
Stomopteryx